Rubiá is a municipality in the Spanish province of Ourense. It has a population of 1448 as of 2016 and an area of 101 km².

References  

Municipalities in the Province of Ourense